The 2006–07 Miami RedHawks men's basketball team represent Miami University in the 2006–07 NCAA Division I men's basketball season. The RedHawks, led by 11th-year head coach Charlie Coles, played their home games at Millett Hall in Oxford, Ohio as members of the Mid-American Conference. The team finished third in the MAC East regular season standings. Playing as the 4 seed in the MAC tournament, Miami defeated Ohio, Toledo, and Akron to earn the conference’s automatic bid to the NCAA tournament. As the No. 14 seed in the Midwest region, the RedHawks fell in a close game to No. 3 seed Oregon, 58–56, to finish 18–15 (10–6 MAC).

Roster

Schedule and results

|-
!colspan=9 style=| Regular season

|-
!colspan=9 style=| MAC tournament

|-
!colspan=9 style=| NCAA tournament

Source

Rankings

References

Miami RedHawks men's basketball seasons
Miami (OH)
Miami (OH)